Louis Legendre (1655–1733), was a French historian.

Born at Rouen (Normandy) to poor parents, Legendre owed the benefit of an education to François de Harlay de Champvallon, the archbishop of his native city, whom he followed to Paris, where he received a canonical at Notre Dame. He then went on to become abbot of Clairfontaine.

Legendre's style has been described as elegant, correct, and his criticism judicious and impartial. The facts he recounts are always backed up by convincing evidence. While not a first rank historian, Legendre nonetheless offers information of interest.

Legendre was the first benefactor of the Académie des Sciences, Belles-Lettres et Arts de Rouen. He also founded the competitive examination prize for the Paris colleges.

Sources
 
 
 

18th-century French historians
Writers from Rouen
1655 births
1733 deaths
French male non-fiction writers
19th-century French historians